Raja Abel is an Indian actor who worked in Telugu films. He is best known for his role in the Telugu film Anand.

He debuted in 2002, playing a small role in the romantic comedy O Chinnadana. Since entering the industry, he has appeared in the successful films like Anand, Aa Naluguru, Vennela, and Style.

Early and personal life

Raja was born as Raja Abel in Visakhapatnam. He was born to Indian Telugu father and British mother.

He canvased in support of YSRCP in the Indian elections of 2014. Raja has quit film industry and is currently serving as a pastor in Hyderabad. He married Amritha in 2014 and they have a daughter named Leora. Raja is a Christian and has been invited to several Christian meetings as a guest speaker in India and the United States.

Filmography

References

External links 
 

Living people
Male actors in Telugu cinema
Indian male film actors
Male actors in Tamil cinema
1978 births
Indian Christians
Male actors from Visakhapatnam
21st-century Indian male actors
People from Uttarandhra
Telugu male actors